Ray Didinger (born September 18, 1946 in Philadelphia) is an American sportswriter, radio personality, sports commentator author and screenwriter. He is a member of the Pro Football Hall of Fame as part of the Writer's Honor Roll.

Early life
Born to Raymond and Marie Didinger, and raised in Folsom, Pennsylvania, Didinger graduated from St. James High School in 1964. He received a B.S. in Communications from Temple University in 1968. His nickname was Nauga, after the animated character used in commercials for Naugahyde. Didinger spent four years doing sports radio for WRTI, a public radio station owned by Temple, and served as the station's Sports Director.

Career

Author
In 1990, Didinger wrote The Super Bowl: Celebrating a Quarter-Century of America's Greatest Game.  He co-authored Football America: Celebrating Our National Passion along with Don Shula in 1996 and co-wrote The Eagles Encyclopedia with Robert S. Lyons in 2005.  Didinger also co-wrote The Ultimate Book of Sports Movies with fellow-Philadelphia radio personality Glen Macnow in 2009.  He wrote his memoir, Finished Business: My Fifty Years of Headlines, Heroes, and Heartaches Hardcover in 2021.

Radio
Didinger co-hosted a popular radio show every Saturday and Sunday from 10 a.m. to 1 p.m. on 94.1 WIP in Philadelphia with co-host Glen Macnow. The show featured Didinger and Macnow discussing aspects of Philadelphia sports. It was also common to hear the two talk about movies, since both are avid movie fans. Didinger and Macnow co-wrote a book entitled The Ultimate Book of Sports Movies, featuring what they both considered the all-time best in cinema sports dramas, published and released in 2009.
  
On May 8, 2022, during his radio show, Didinger announced his retirement effective May 29, 2022. Saying he was in good health and was not being pushed out the door, he would work until the end of his contract and then retire from radio and television. Didinger said he wanted to spend more time with his wife and family. In 2023, it was announced that Didinger would return to 94.1 WIP as an Eagles contributor in a part-time capacity for the station's new morning show.

Sportswriter
Didinger covered the National Football League for The Philadelphia Bulletin and The Philadelphia Daily News for more than 25 years.  He was named Pennsylvania Sportswriter of the Year five times by the National Sportscasters and Sportswriters Association. In 1995, he won the Dick McCann Memorial Award for long and distinguished coverage of pro football, and his name was added to the writers' honor roll in the Pro Football Hall of Fame in Canton, Ohio.

Television
Didinger served as a full-time member of NBC Sports Philadelphia, writing articles and appearing on-air in a variety of roles, most prominently in  Eagles Pre Game Live and Eagles Post Game Live.  In 2022, he retired from his on-air role at NBC Sports. He returned on-air back to NBC sports for the 2022-2023 NFL Playoffs. Didinger was a senior producer with NFL Films in Mount Laurel, New Jersey until he was bought out of his contract in February 2009.  He has won four Emmy Awards for his work as a writer and producer on the weekly series NFL Films Presents and the Turner Network documentary Football America.

Playwright
Didinger wrote a 75-minute play, "Tommy and Me", about his fight to get childhood hero, Tommy McDonald into the Pro Football Hall of Fame. As a child, Didinger spent a lot of time with McDonald at Eagles training camp in Hershey, Pennsylvania. The play "Portrays key moments in his friendship with McDonald."

Personal
Didinger is married to Philadelphia magazine restaurant critic Maria Gallagher and has two children, David and Kathleen.  He also has an English Bulldog named Mack.  Ray and his wife are active with HeavenSent Bulldog Rescue (“HeavenSent”) a New Jersey non-profit corporation, dedicated to the rescue and placement for adoption of Bulldogs.

Awards and honors
Dick McCann Memorial Award, 1995.
Pennsylvania Sportswriter of the Year, 5-time winner.
Keystone Press Awards, 6-time winner.
Associated Press Award for Column Writing, 3-time winner.
Pro Football Writers of America Award for Outstanding Feature Story, 1991.
Member of the Philadelphia Sports Hall of Fame, 2005.
"Reds" Bagnell Award, Maxwell Football Club, 2022.
NFL Hall of Fame, Bill Nunn Memorial Award, Professional Football Writers of America, 1995.

Bibliography
The Super Bowl: Celebrating a Quarter-Century of America's Greatest Game (1990).  Simon & Schuster 
Football America: Celebrating Our National Passion with Phil Barber and Don Shula (1996). Turner Publishing 
Game Plans For Success (1996). McGraw-Hill 
The Eagles Encyclopedia with Robert S. Lyons (2005).  Temple University Press 
One Last Read: The Collected Works of the World's Slowest Sportswriter (2007). Temple University Press 
The Ultimate Book of Sports Movies with Glen Macnow (2009).  Running Press 
Finished Business: My Fifty Years of Headlines, Heroes, and Heartaches Hardcover (2021). Temple University Press

See also
 Philadelphia Eagles
 NBC Sports Philadelphia

References

External links

Ray Didinger interview
Broadcast Pioneers Profile
More information on Ray Didinger
Radio interview with Ray Didinger on Fresh Air (38 mins.; 2014)
Behavioral Corner Podcast interview with Ray Didinger(37:40 mins.; 2020)

1946 births
Living people
Temple University alumni
American sports radio personalities
Sportswriters from Pennsylvania
Dick McCann Memorial Award recipients
Sportspeople from Delaware County, Pennsylvania
Sports Emmy Award winners
Writers from Philadelphia
Philadelphia Eagles announcers
20th-century American non-fiction writers
American sports journalists